A game character is a person or any other entity acting in a game.

Game character may also refer to:
 Player character, a character or a role in tabletop and video games, who is controlled by a player, typically a protagonist of the game's plot
 Alternate character, another controllable character in addition to the main player character
 Non-player character, or NPC, a character controlled by a game-master in tabletop role-playing games or by a program in video games.
 Boss (video games), a significant computer-controlled enemy in video games
 Mob (video games), short for "mobile". A type of computer-controlled non-player characters, whose primary purpose is to be killed for experience, quest objective, or loot

See also
 Virtual character (disambiguation)
 Artificial intelligence in video games

Game characters